Judd, for the Defense is an American legal drama originally broadcast on the ABC network on Friday nights from September 8, 1967, to March 21, 1969.

Synopsis
The show stars Carl Betz, who had previously spent eight years in the role of Dr. Alex Stone, husband of Donna Reed in ABC's The Donna Reed Show. In his new role, reportedly based on high-profile lawyers such as F. Lee Bailey and Percy Foreman, Betz played Clinton Judd, a flamboyant attorney based in Houston, who often took on controversial cases across the country. Playing his top assistant, Ben Caldwell, was Stephen Young.

Even before the show premiered, Foreman threatened a lawsuit by saying that the program was "appropriating for commercial purposes my career as a lawyer." Throughout the course of the two-year run of the show, there were never enough viewers to establish Foreman's claim, although critics gave it positive reviews. Undoubtedly, the skittishness of viewers was a result of the program's dealing with then-taboo (though contemporary) subjects such as homosexuality, blacklisting, and draft evasion, with open-ended conclusions in many episodes.

The show's producer, Harold Gast, sought to break new ground with the program, using a number of new writers for scripts that veered away from previous television conventions. In addition, one personal experience involving credit card problems caused by computers became the basis for an episode titled "Epitaph on a Computer Card". In 1968, Gast and writer Leon Tokatyan won an Edgar Award from the Mystery Writers of America for the episode "Tempest in a Texas Town".

In an attempt to boost the low ratings of the hour-long program, the episode which aired on January 31, 1969, combined the Judd cast with that of another ABC series, Felony Squad, starring Dennis Cole. The idea did not salvage either program, as both were soon cancelled.

Betz's portrayal of a lawyer was enough to provide him paid opportunities to speak before groups of attorneys, and also helped him win both Golden Globe and Emmy Awards after the show's final season. Additionally, screenwriter Robert Lewin won a Writer's Guild award for the episode "To Kill a Madman".

Other actors appearing on episodes of the show included Ed Asner, Karen Black, Scott Brady, Len Birman, Russ Conway, Tyne Daly, Richard Dreyfuss, Robert Duvall, Lee Grant, Rodolfo Hoyos, Jr., Ron Howard, Vivi Janiss, Wright King, Ida Lupino, Barry Morse, Jessica Tandy, Lurene Tuttle, and William Windom.

Episode guide

Season 1 (1967–68)

Season 2 (1968–69)

Notes

External links

1967 American television series debuts
1969 American television series endings
American Broadcasting Company original programming
American legal drama television series
Edgar Award-winning works
English-language television shows
Television series by 20th Century Fox Television
Television shows set in Houston